Jake Stovall (born January 10, 1994) is an American professional soccer player who currently plays for the Dayton Dutch Lions in the USL League Two.

Career

Early career
Stovall played four years of college soccer at Wright State University between 2013 and 2016. While at college, Stovall appeared for Premier Development League side Cincinnati Dutch Lions between 2014 and 2016.

Professional
On January 17, 2017,  Stovall was selected by Seattle Sounders FC in the third round of the 2017 Major League Soccer SuperDraft as the 66th overall pick. Unsigned by Seattle, Stovall signed with North American Soccer League side Puerto Rico FC on March 2, 2017. In April 2018, Stovall signed with the Dayton Dutch Lions.

References

1994 births
Living people
American soccer players
Association football defenders
Cincinnati Dutch Lions players
Dayton Dutch Lions players
North American Soccer League players
People from Centerville, Ohio
Puerto Rico FC players
Seattle Sounders FC draft picks
Soccer players from Ohio
USL League Two players
Wright State Raiders men's soccer players